FC Arman (Arman Fýtbol Klýby) are a defunct Kazakhstani football based in Kentau. They were members of the Kazakhstan First Division.

Name History
1968 : Founded as Gornyak
1992 : The club is renamed Arman

Arman, FC
1968 establishments in the Kazakh Soviet Socialist Republic